High Beech Speedway also known as Kings Oak Speedway (because of its location by the Kings Oaks Hotel) are a defunct British motorcycle speedway team who operated between 1928 and 1931 and were based at High Beach, Loughton, Epping Forest District, Essex, England.

History
High Beech competed in the 1930 Speedway Southern League finishing 11th. The club returned the following season and finished sixth in the 1931 Speedway Southern League.

It was inevitable that without a stadium as such, the club would not be able to compete with the bigger teams and they duly folded after the 1930 season. The venue is famous within the speedway word due to the fact that it held the first known speedway meeting (an oval cinder circuit) in Britain, on 19 February 1928.

Notable riders
Billy Dallison

Season summary

References

Defunct British speedway teams